Kashedi Ghat is a mountain pass in India located on the Mumbai–Goa–Kochi national highway. This ghat is near Poladpur, on the Mahad to Khed section. It has a deadly curve, which make it one of the difficult ghats in Maharastra.

References

Mountain passes of Maharashtra